Tomás Glênio Berra (born 19 February 1991) is an Argentine professional footballer who plays as a centre-back for Chacarita Juniors.

Career
Berra started in the youth of Rosario Central, his local team. He remained in the youth ranks between 2005 and 2013 before he was promoted into the first-team squad, he then made his senior debut on 25 March 2013 in a 3–4 win away to Atlético Tucumán in the 2012–13 Primera B Nacional. Rosario won promotion in that season to the 2013–14 Argentine Primera División. He made thirty appearances in his first two seasons (2013–14 and 2014) in Argentina's top-flight but then didn't feature in the 2015 campaign. After the 2015 season, Berra departed Rosario to join top division club Godoy Cruz.

However, he left six months later without making an appearance in 2016. He subsequently joined fellow Primera División club Arsenal de Sarandí. His Arsenal debut came on 18 September versus Temperley. In August 2017, Berra joined Primera B Nacional side Santamarina.

Career statistics
.

Honours
Rosario Central
Primera B Nacional: 2012–13

References

External links

1991 births
Living people
Footballers from Rosario, Santa Fe
Argentine footballers
Argentine expatriate footballers
Association football defenders
Primera Nacional players
Argentine Primera División players
Serie D players
Rosario Central footballers
Godoy Cruz Antonio Tomba footballers
Arsenal de Sarandí footballers
Club y Biblioteca Ramón Santamarina footballers
S.S.D. F.C. Messina players
Sarmiento de Resistencia footballers
Chacarita Juniors footballers
Argentine expatriate sportspeople in Italy
Expatriate footballers in Italy